"Used to Be in Love" is a song by Australian indie-pop band The Jungle Giants. It was released in March 2018 as the fourth and final single from the band's third studio album Quiet Ferocity. The single was certified platinum in Australia in December  2019.

Band member Sam Hales said "When we first recorded this song it wasn't even a dance song. The song was being super stubborn and I told it, 'If you don't want to get on the bus and go to the beach with everyone else then you can stay at home.' But then we put a 4x4 dance pattern in the song and it became something else entirely."

At the Queensland Music Awards of 2019, "Used to Be in Love" won Rock Song of the Year.

Track listing
Digital download
 "Used to Be in Love" – 3:42

Certifications

References

2017 songs
2018 singles
The Jungle Giants songs